Harri Hänninen (born 18 October 1963, in Helsinki) is a retired Finnish male long-distance runner who specialized in the marathon.

International competitions

Personal bests
5000 metres - 13:28.22 minutes (1990)
10,000 metres - 28:00.73 minutes (1989)

References

1963 births
Living people
Athletes from Helsinki
Finnish male long-distance runners
Athletes (track and field) at the 1992 Summer Olympics
Athletes (track and field) at the 1996 Summer Olympics
Olympic athletes of Finland
Finnish male marathon runners